BurJuman (formerly Khalid Bin Al Waleed) is a rapid transit station serving the Red and Green Lines of the Dubai Metro in Dubai, UAE. It is one of two transfer stations between the two lines, the other being Union. Since it began service, over 15.611 million passengers have used BurJuman station, making it the second-busiest station of the Dubai Metro network.

History
One of the first stations of the Dubai Metro, BurJuman opened as Khalid Bin Al Waleed on 9 September 2009 as part of the initial stretch of the Red Line from Rashidiya to Nakheel Harbour and Towers along with seven other intermediate stations. On November 13, 2012, the station was renamed after the BurJuman shopping centre (located just outside Exit 3 of this station), which had become popularly used despite being unofficial.

Location
BurJuman station is located in the historic centre of Dubai, below the BurJuman shopping centre, after which it is named. Specifically, it lies below the intersection of Sheikh Khalifa Bin Zayed Street and Khalid Bin Al Waleed Road. It is the closest station to a number of consulates, including those to Canada, Egypt, India and the United Kingdom. The station is also close to Al Seef (including a Marine Transport Station on Dubai Creek) and Karama.

Station layout
Along with Union, BurJuman is one of only two interchange stations on the Dubai Metro, giving it an unconventional layout and among the largest in the system. The Red Line travels under Sheikh Khalifa bin Zayed Street, crossing perpendicularly with the Green Line, which lies below Khalid Bin Al Waleed Road. The Red and Green Lines both utilise two side platforms with two platforms on differing levels.

Platform layout
Platform numbers were not assigned, but instead given names according to the direction of the train. This changed on December 17, 2020, where platforms in all stations were now numbered.

References

External links
 

Railway stations in the United Arab Emirates opened in 2009
Dubai Metro stations